Boxing From Jamaica Arena is a TV sports series broadcast by the DuMont Television Network from 1946 to 1949. The program aired boxing from Jamaica Arena in Queens, New York. The program aired on Monday and Wednesday nights at 9pm ET and was 90 to 120 minutes long. An earlier program of the same name had aired on NBC from July 8, 1940 until May 18, 1942.

Episode status
As with most DuMont series, no episodes are known to exist. Some episodes may exist under the umbrella title Boxing With Dennis James  at the UCLA Film and Television Archive.

See also
List of programs broadcast by the DuMont Television Network
List of surviving DuMont Television Network broadcasts
1948-49 United States network television schedule
Amateur Boxing Fight Club (September 1949 – 1950)
Wrestling From Marigold (September 1949 – 1955)
Boxing From Eastern Parkway (May 1952-May 1954)
Boxing From St. Nicholas Arena (1954-1956)
Saturday Night at the Garden (1950-1951)

References

Bibliography
David Weinstein, The Forgotten Network: DuMont and the Birth of American Television (Philadelphia: Temple University Press, 2004) 
Alex McNeil, Total Television, Fourth edition (New York: Penguin Books, 1980) 
Tim Brooks and Earle Marsh, The Complete Directory to Prime Time Network TV Shows, Third edition (New York: Ballantine Books, 1964)

External links
 
DuMont historical website

DuMont Television Network original programming
1946 American television series debuts
1949 American television series endings
Black-and-white American television shows
English-language television shows
Lost television shows
Boxing television series
DuMont sports programming